Ben Forta is Adobe Systems Inc's Senior Director of Education Initiatives. His primary responsibility is a focus on students, both K-12 and higher-ed, with an eye towards digital and visual literacy, and the role that Adobe services and tools play in the future of communication and storytelling. He is the author of over 40 technical books (with over 750,000 copies in print) on SQL (including the best-selling SQL book of all time), Regular Expressions, ColdFusion, Windows development, JSP, and more. Many of his books have been translated into over fifteen languages worldwide. Before working for Allaire and Macromedia, he founded the website Car.com, which was later purchased by Auto-By-Tel. Born in London, England, Forta lives in Oak Park, Michigan with his wife and their children.

Bibliography

Coauthored works

References

External links
 

American computer businesspeople
American computer programmers
American technology writers
People in information technology
Living people
Year of birth missing (living people)